Ideas of Reference is the debut album by Psyopus, released on October 19, 2004.

Track listing
"Mork and Mindy (Daydream Lover)" – 3:56
"The White Light" – 3:22
"Death, I..." – 4:58
"The Long Road to the 4th Dimension" – 4:06
"Mannequin" – 2:43
"MirrorriM" – 2:51
"Imogen's Puzzle" – 1:59
"Anomaly" – 3:39
"Bones to Dust" (silence from 4:23 to 7:30, and then hidden track) – 15:39

Personnel 
Adam Frapolli - Vocals
Christopher Arp - Guitar
Greg Herman - Drums
Fred DeCoste - Bass

References

2004 debut albums
Psyopus albums
Black Market Activities albums